Franklin "Frank" McCabe (March 10, 1859 – June 26, 1924) was an American jockey and a Hall of Fame trainer of Thoroughbred racehorses.

McCabe began his career as a jockey before becoming a leading trainer during the latter part of the 19th century and for the first few decades of the 20th century. He began his training career as an assistant to James G. Rowe, Sr., and after 1884, took charge of the Dwyer Brothers Stable when Rowe left. Following the dissolution of the Dwyer Brothers racing partnership, McCabe stayed as the trainer for Philip J. Dwyer until late 1901, when he signed with the prominent Canadian owner, William M. Hendrie.

Frank McCabe was inducted in the National Museum of Racing and Hall of Fame in 2007.

References

1859 births
1924 deaths
American horse trainers
United States Thoroughbred Racing Hall of Fame inductees
Sportspeople from Paterson, New Jersey